Jacques Vilcoq (born 1942) is a French coxswain.

Vilcoq was born in 1942. He competed at the 1956 European Rowing Championships in Bled, Yugoslavia, with the men's eight where they won the silver medal. The same team went to the 1956 Summer Olympics in Melbourne with the men's eight where they were eliminated in the round one heat.

References

1942 births
Living people
French male rowers
Olympic rowers of France
Rowers at the 1956 Summer Olympics
Coxswains (rowing)
European Rowing Championships medalists